The South American Basketball Championship 1960 was the 18th edition of this tournament.  It was held from March 3 to March 18 in Córdoba, Argentina and won by the Brazil national basketball team.  7 teams competed.

Results

References
FIBA Archive

1960
Championship
International basketball competitions hosted by Argentina
1960 in Argentine sport
Sport in Córdoba, Argentina
March 1960 sports events in South America